Amelia Chellini (16 June 1880 – 31 May 1944), was an Italian film actress. She appeared in 38 films between 1912 and 1944. She was born in Florence, Italy and died in Rome, Italy.

Selected filmography

 La segretaria per tutti (1933)
 Bad Subject (1933)
 Full Speed (1934)
 La Damigella di Bard (1936)
 God's Will Be Done (1936)
 The Amnesiac (1936)
 We Were Seven Widows (1939)
 Mille chilometri al minuto (1939)
 Maddalena, Zero for Conduct (1940)
 The Brambilla Family Go on Holiday (1941)
 The Prisoner of Santa Cruz (1941)
 The Happy Ghost (1941)
 Tragic Night (1942)
 Measure for Measure (1943)
 Annabella's Adventure (1943)
 Wedding Day (1944)

References

External links

1880 births
1944 deaths
Italian film actresses
Italian silent film actresses
Actors from Florence
20th-century Italian actresses